The Nanaimo City Council is the governing body for the city of Nanaimo, British Columbia, Canada. The council consists of the mayor and eight councillors.

The councillors are councillors-at-large elected for the entire city.

Municipal elections are held every four years across the Province on the third Saturday of November.

The first woman to be mayor in Nanaimo was Joy Leach (1990–1993), who defeated long-time mayor Frank Ney.

Nanaimo City Council members 
Current (2022)

The current city council was elected in 2022.

Leonard Krog, Mayor
Paul Manly, Councillor
Sheryl Armstrong, Councillor
Tyler Brown, Councillor
Ben Geselbracht, Councillor
Erin Hemmens, Councillor
Ian Thorpe, Councillor
Janice Perrino, Councillor
Hilary Eastmure, Councillor

References

External links 
Nanaimo City Council website

Municipal councils in British Columbia
Politics of Nanaimo